Americus is a small census-designated place in Washington Township, Tippecanoe County, in the U.S. state of Indiana.

The community is part of the Lafayette, Indiana Metropolitan Statistical Area.

History
A post office was established at Americus in 1833, and remained in operation until it was discontinued in 1902.

Geography
Americus is located at 40°31'34" North, 86°45'29" West (40.526111, -86.758056) at an elevation of 558 feet, on the southern bank of the Wabash River in Washington Township.

Demographics

References

Census-designated places in Tippecanoe County, Indiana
Census-designated places in Indiana
Lafayette metropolitan area, Indiana